Daniel Bambaata Robert Nesta Marley (born 12 July 1989) is a Jamaican singer-songwriter. He is the eldest son of Ziggy Marley, and eldest grandson of Bob Marley.

Personal life

Bambaata Marley spent his early years in Jamaica before moving to Miami, Florida. He currently resides in Los Angeles, California.

Career
Bambaata Marley debuted in 2009 with the single "Live It Inna Fear", produced by Damian Marley.

In 2010, he collaborated with his cousin Jo Mersa Marley on the single "My Girl".

In 2011, he collaborated with his father Ziggy Marley, on the song "Changes".

On 16 September 2015, the music video for his single "Waiting for the War" was released, the music video was awarded a Telly Award for 'Best Online Music Video' and a Telly Awards for 'Craft-Directing Video' by Wayan Palmieri. The artwork cover for "Waiting for the War" was a re-creation of Bob Marley's Soul Rebels album cover released by Bob Marley & the Wailers in 1970.

In 2017, he made his screen debut in the short film Vagabonds starring Danny Glover & Robert Ri'chard.

Discography

Singles
 Live It Inna Fear (2009)
 2-Feet (2012)
 Maintain (2014)
 Waiting For the War (2015)
 If You Go (2015)
 Unconditional (2017)
 Ocean Ocean (2017)
 Out To Play (2017)
 Deadbeat (2018)
 In a Ray (2018)
 Pretty Butterfly (2018)
 UFO (2018)
 Beyond (2020)
 Fight Your Fears (2020)

As featured artist
 Jo Mersa Marley "My Girl" (Feat. Daniel Bambaata) (2010)
 Ziggy Marley "Changes" (Feat. Daniel Marley) (2011)
 Inner Circle "Free It Up" (Feat. Daniel Bambaata Marley) (2015)
 The Internet "Get Away (Feat. Daniel Marley) (2015)
 Lorine Chia "The Reason" (Feat. Bambaata Marley) (2018)

Filmography

Films 
 Vagabonds (2017) – Dejohn (short film)

Music videos

Awards and nominations
 2017: Telly Award for 'Best Online Music Video' – "Waiting for the War"
 2017: Telly Award for 'Directing' (Wayan Palmieri) – "Waiting for the War"
 2018: Telly Award for 'Best Online Music Video' – "Unconditional"

References

External links
 
 

1989 births
Living people
21st-century American singers
Jamaican rappers
Jamaican pop singers
Jamaican reggae singers
Jamaican songwriters
Jamaican male singers
Jamaican Rastafarians
Jamaican people of Cuban descent
Jamaican people of English descent
Jamaican people of Ghanaian descent
Jamaican people of Jewish descent
Bambaata
Musicians from Kingston, Jamaica